Moshood 'Bola' Abdul Aziz (born 22 July 1968 in Kaduna) is a retired Nigerian footballer. He currently works as the coach of the Atlantis FC.

Career
Moshood (Bola) played professionally for FC Ilves, Ponnistus, Huima, FC Kontu in Finland.

Coaching career
He began his coaching career in 1998-2004 for PK-35, a Youth Premier League team and as head coach of Ponnistus FC—a Pro-Second Division in Finland 2005-2008. He was also in charge of the Helsinki International Youth Cup annual summer tournament.

On 30 March 2010, Bola was named the head coach of the Atlantis FC, a Pro-Second Division club in Finland. In the same capacity, he is also the director of coaching for the youth team -- Atlantis FC Akatemia. Coach Bola helped Atlantis to redeem its image after losing 12 games in 13 pre season games and draw one game in preparation for the 2010 Season. He helped Atlantis win their first ever game in the season in the first match at the start of the season against FC FUTURA. Bola, as he is popularly known, is known for his tough trainings, standardized technical training method and above all discipline. Atlantis quickly became a notable team in the city of Helsinki and the team to beat. Bola definitely will in no time be noticed in the world of football coaching and be compared to the rising stars of football coaches.

Mohammedan Sporting Club is the largest fan based club in Kolkata and India in large, but has been underground in the past 50 years, and it fans based was diminishing daily and without trophy to show. But coach Bola came and transformed the club into a trophy winning team and a force to recond with in Indian football. A trophy which has eluded MSC for 73 years he came and won it (Durand Cup), Winning 14 straight matches; beaten a team 7 nil which is a landmark in MSC history. Beaten Prayag UTD in the state league and beaten Sporting Club De Goa away in national league a feet that has never been achieved before he came.

He came to India and transformed MSC into a household name in India football, he brought a new dimension into India football and made msc a force to be recond with in Kolkata football, his highly technical input was the reason MSC broke into the ranks of east Bengal, Dempo and Churchill brothers with their eye catching and entertaining football which the league experienced recently, a gentle man and a dedicated coach who is committed to his job, a coach who have the credibility of transforming average players to great players, coach Bola is a disciplined coach with a good heart towards players working with him, above all he has the charisma of a winner naturally in him.

As of 2016, Moshood has been the head coach of the Helsinki based team called FC Finnkurd. They will be playing in the Respect Finnish Cup on the Fall 2016.

Achievements

As player
In 1985 Moshood was a member of Nigeria National team under-18 years that won a gold medal in the World Cup in Tampere, Finland, in 1985. He was the top scorer of the competition. Moshood played with the Nigeria National League for under-20 team. At the Adebajo Cup, the team won a gold medal in 1985 and a silver medal in 1986.

In 1987, he won a bronze medal with FC Ilves under-20-year team in the Finnish league. Between the years 1992 and 1995 he was a member of FC Ponnistus. On that time, the team was promoted twice. At first to the first division and secondly to Premier League of Finland. In 1994 FC Ponnistus was on the top in the first division.

As manager
Moshood has won three medals from two tournaments and a Helsinki District Championship between 1999 and 2001 with FC PK-35 in Finland. Under the season 2001-2002, Moshood was promoted to manage the Premier League instead of the first division of the FC PK-35.

In 2013 Moshood led their team Mohammedan Sporting Club to championship in the Durand Cup in India. PROMOTION, Atlantis FC U-20 to the Premier league 2018, PROMOTION, Atlantis Academy to the Third Division 2018, Finland Football Federation U-20 Premier league, I lead Atlantis FC TO SILVA MEDAL 2019, In the same capacity, I lead Atlantis FC senior team to PROMOTION to Second division 2019,Finland Football Federation U-20 Premier league, I lead Atlantis FC to SILVA MEDAL 2020.

References

1968 births
Living people
Sportspeople from Kaduna
Nigerian footballers
Nigerian expatriate footballers
FC Kontu players
Mohammedan SC (Kolkata) players
Expatriate footballers in Finland
Ponnistus Helsinki players
FC Ilves players
Nigerian expatriates in Finland
Nigerian football managers
Expatriate football managers in India
Association football forwards